Alexander Chocke  (by 1566–1607), of Avington, Berkshire was an English politician who sat in the House of Commons from 17 October 1605 until his death in 1607.

Biography
Chocke was from a family established in Somerset since the early 15th century. Chocke held the seat until his death on 29 July 1607.

Notes

References

1607 deaths
English MPs 1604–1611
Year of birth uncertain
People from Kintbury